Dictyandra is a genus of flowering plants in the family Rubiaceae. The genus is found in tropical Africa.

Species
Dictyandra arborescens Welw. ex Hook.f. - Benin, Ghana, Guinea, Ivory Coast, Liberia, Nigeria, Sierra Leone, Cabinda Province, Central African Republic, Cameroon, Congo, Equatorial Guinea, Gulf of Guinea Islands, D.R.Congo, Uganda, Angola
Dictyandra congolana Robbr. - Congo, D.R.Congo

References

External links
Dictyandra in the World Checklist of Rubiaceae

Rubiaceae genera
Pavetteae
Taxa named by Joseph Dalton Hooker